Aguilar de Segarra is a municipality in the comarca of Bages, on the eastern edge of the comarca, in the province of Barcelona, Catalonia, Spain.

Aguilar de Segarra has several notable buildings: the Castle of Castellar, the Castle of Aguilar, and the churches of Sant Andreu d'Aguilar, Sant Miquel de Castellar, Santa Magdalena de Còdol-Rodon, Santa Maria de les Coromines and Santa Maria del Grauet.

Demography
According to Spanish census data, this is the population of Aguilar de Segarra in recent years.

References

External links 
 Government data pages 

Municipalities in Bages
Populated places in Bages